A. K. Chandran (10 June 1946) was an Indian politician and leader of the Communist Party of India (CPI). He represented the Mala constituency in the twelfth Kerala Legislative Assembly elected in the 2006 Kerala Legislative Assembly election.

References

Communist Party of India politicians from Kerala
1946 births
Living people
Place of birth missing (living people)